Kermit Joseph Alexander (born January 4, 1941) is a former American football defensive back in the National Football League. He was on the board of directors for the Lott IMPACT Trophy, which is named after Pro Football Hall of Fame defensive back Ronnie Lott, and is awarded annually to college football's defensive IMPACT Player of the Year.

Professional career
Alexander was drafted by the San Francisco 49ers with the eighth pick in the first round of the 1963 NFL Draft. He was also drafted by the Denver Broncos of the American Football League with the fifth overall pick, but chose to sign with San Francisco. Alexander played alongside Pro Football Hall of Fame cornerback Jimmy Johnson. Alexander was selected to play in the Pro Bowl in 1968, after a season in which he had a career-high nine interceptions, including an interception he returned 66 yards for a touchdown.
Alexander played for the 49ers from 1963 to 1969.

In his second year with the Los Angeles Rams in 1971, he returned one of his three interceptions 82 yards for a touchdown.  He played one final season with the Philadelphia Eagles in 1973.
Kermit was responsible for injuring Gale Sayers's right knee in a rolling tackle which shortened the career of the Bears star running back, and cost Sayers some of his extraordinary quickness.

In addition to playing defense, Alexander returned punts and kickoffs for all three teams.  Both of his career punt returns for touchdowns came with San Francisco.

Personal life
On August 31, 1984, Alexander's mother, sister and two nephews, ages 8 and 13, were murdered in South Central Los Angeles during a home invasion by members of the Rollin 60's Neighborhood Crips, whose intended victims lived two doors away.

Alexander was initially planning on adopting one child from Haiti, but after meeting the child's four siblings, he ended up adopting all five.  The five were in Haiti at the time of the earthquake in 2010, but survived and now live with Alexander and his wife, Tami.

See also
Tiequon Cox

References

External links

1941 births
American emigrants to Haiti
American football cornerbacks
American football return specialists
American football safeties
Living people
Los Angeles Rams players
People from New Iberia, Louisiana
Philadelphia Eagles players
Players of American football from Louisiana
San Francisco 49ers players
UCLA Bruins football players
United States Football League announcers
Western Conference Pro Bowl players
Presidents of the National Football League Players Association
Trade unionists from California